Moisés Ferreira Gomes (born May 15, 1989 in Belém), known as Moisés, is a Brazilian footballer who currently plays for Ypiranga Clube - AP as a striker.

Career
His debut as a professional came at the end of 2008. The athlete was loaned to the Black Team to give the player experience. The planned was successful and the team managed to qualify for the main phase of the competition. It was then that Moses gained greater prominence. He was the team's top scorer with six goals, despite the bad year of Team Black. It was this match that the fans began to look the player with different eyes.

In 2010, Moisés returned to Paysandu and won a chance among professionals. The then coach Luiz Carlos Barbieri cast him alongside Bruno Rangel, as holder of the premiere team in the Championship Paraense. This happened because the veteran Didi, and experienced Enilton still not in playing condition. But Moses showed everyone a great game. His performance was marked with the winning goal for 2-1 against the Independent, at the last minute of play.

In Brazil Cup 2010, Moisés had a great chance to stand out nationally against Palmeiras, when much was expected of him. Besides having passed unnoticed, the player had not made decent football in the Football Championship Para.

The player fought in court to terminate the contract with Paysandu. In the weeks, the club Santos Futebol Clube São Paulo, has offered £100,000 for a one-year loan with option to buy. The player's economic rights are stipulated for $2.2 million.

On 14 June 2011, he moved to Brazilian Série B side Náutico on loan.

Career statistics
(Correct )

Honours
Campeão Paraense 2010

References

External links
 Santos FC
 ogol.com

1989 births
Living people
Brazilian footballers
Santos FC players
Clube Náutico Capibaribe players
Ipatinga Futebol Clube players
Association football forwards
Sportspeople from Belém